Michael J. Walter is an American experimental petrologist at Earth and Planetary Laboratory (EPL, formally Geophysical Lab and Department of Terrestrial Magnetism) of the Carnegie Institution of Washington. He is also the director of EPL. He was on Editorial Board of JGR: Solid Earth from 2012 to 2018. Michael studies how rocks behave when transported to deep Earth interiors and associated elemental behaviors. He also uses super-deep diamonds to study the how Earth's mantle works.

Research 
Walter uses experimental petrology to research on early Earth's history, when the planet just formed from accretion of the cloud of gas and dust surrounding our young Sun, and when distinct layers of Earth's mantle and core start to take shape. He also investigates physical properties of deep materials in Earth's interior, focusing on extracting information about mantle conditions from tiny compositional variations preserved inside diamonds.

References 

Geophysicists
Geology award winners
University of Texas at Dallas alumni
University of Nebraska alumni
Fellows of the American Geophysical Union
Year of birth missing (living people)
Living people